François Duval (born August 10, 1903 in Vauclin, Martinique, and died June 28, 1984 in Fort-de-France) was a politician from Martinique who served in the  French Senate from 1968-1977 .

References 
 page on the French Senate website

Senators of Martinique
French people of Martiniquais descent
French Senators of the Fifth Republic
1903 births
1984 deaths